The Otterbach is a stream near Königsbruck in Saxony, Germany. It is a right tributary of the Pulsnitz, which it joins near Thiendorf. The Otterbach and Pulsnitz area an important eco-system for animals at threat of extinction such as the otter and various bird species.

See also
List of rivers of Saxony

References 

Rivers of Saxony
Rivers of Germany